This page is a list of Roman Catholic bishops and archbishops of Ravenna and, from 1985, of the Archdiocese of Ravenna-Cervia. The earlier ones were frequently tied to the Exarchate of Ravenna. (The city also became the centre of the Orthodox Church in Italy in 1995.)

Diocese of Ravenna (1st – 6th)
St. Apollinare, legendarily to 79, historically in the era of Septimius Severus
St. Aderito (Aderitus)
St. Eleucadio (Eleucadius)
St. Marciano (Marcian) —  died c. 127 — feast day May 22.
St. Calogero (Calocerus)
St. Proculo (Proculus)
St. Probo I (Probus I) —  died 175
St. Dato (Datus)
St. Liberio I (Liberius I)
St. Agapito (Agapitus)
St. Marcellino (Marcellinus)
St. Severo (Severus) (c. 308–c. 348)
St. Liberio II (Liberius II)
St. Probo II (Probus II)
Fiorenzio (Florentius)
Liberio III (Liberius III) (c. 380–c. 399)
St. Urso (Ursus) (c. 399–c. 426), who built the original basilica to the Resurrection of Our Lord (called Anastasis in the Byzantine period)
St. Pietro I Crisologo (c. 426–c. 450)
Neone (c. 450–c. 473)
Esuperantio (Exuperantius) (c. 473–c. 477)
Giovanni I Angelopte (c. 477–494)
Pietro II (494–519)
Aureliano (Aurelian) (519–521)
Ecclesio (Ecclesius) (522–532) — started construction of San Vitale and is represented in the church's apse mosaic
St. Ursicino (Ursicinus) (533–536) — ordered the Basilica of Sant'Apollinare in Classe to be built
Vittore (Victor) (538–545) — noted on monograms on capitals in San Vitale

Archdiocese of Ravenna (6th century – 1947)

6th century
Massimiano (Maximianus) (546–556) — after whom the Throne of Maximianus is named, 27th bishop, he was the first archbishop.
Agnello (Agnellus) (556–569)
Pietro III the Elder (569–578)
Giovanni II the Roman (578–595)
Mariniano (595–606)

7th century
Giovanni III (607–625)
Giovanni IV (625–c. 631)
Bono (Bonus) (c. 631–c. 644)
Mauro (Maurus) (c. 644–c. 671)
Reparato (Reparatus) (c. 671–c. 677)
Teodoro (Theodore) (c. 677–c. 691)
Damiano (c. 692–c. 709)

8th century
St. Felice (c. 709–c. 725)
Giovanni V (c. 726–c. 744)
Sergius (c. 744–c. 769)
Leo I (c. 770–c. 777)
Giovanni VI (c. 777–c. 784)
Grazioso (Gratiosus) (c. 785–c. 789)
Valerius (c. 789–c. 810)

9th century
Martino (c. 810–c. 818)
Petronace (c. 818–c. 837)
Giorgio (c. 837–c. 846)
Deusdedit (c. 847–c. 850)
Giovanni VII (c. 850–878)
Romano di Calcinaria (Romanus) (878–888)
Deusdedit (889–898)

10th century
Giovanni VIII Kailone (898–904)
Giovanni IX da Tossignano (905–914)
Costantino (914–926)
Peter IV (927–971)
Onesto (971–983)
Giovanni X di Besate (983–998)
Gerberto da Aurillac (Gerbertus) (998–999)

11th century
Leo II (999–1001)
Federico (1002–1004)
Etelberto (1004–1014)
Arnoldo di Sassonia (Arnoldus) (1014–1019)
Eriberto (1019–1027)
Gebeardo da Eichstätt (Bebhardus) (1027–1044)
Witgero (1044–1046)
Unfrido (Hunfredus) (1046–1051)
Giovanni Enrico (1051–1072)
Guiberto da Ravenna (1072–1100)

12th century
Ottone Boccatortia (1100–1110)
Geremia (1110–1117)
Filippo (1118)
Gualtiero (1119–1144)
Mose da Vercelli (1144–1154)
Anselm of Havelberg (Anselmo da Havelberg; 1155–1158)
Guido di Biandrate (1159–1169)
Gerardo (1169–1190)
Guglielmo di Cauriano (1190–1201)

13th century
Alberto Oselletti (1201–1207)
Egidio de Garzoni (1207–1208)
Ubaldo (1208–1216)
Piccinino (1216)
Simeone (1217–1228)
Teoderico (1228–1249)
Filippo da Pistoia (1251–1270)
vacant
Bonifacio Fieschi di Lavagna (1274–1294)
Obizzo Sanvitale (1295–1303)

14th century
St. Rinaldo da Concorezzo (1303–1321)
Rinaldo da Polenta (1321–1322)
Aimerico di Chastellux (1322–1332)
Guido de Roberti (1332–1333)
Francesco Michiel (1333–1342)
Nicola Canal (1342–1347)
Fortanerius Vassalli (1347–1351)
St. Silas Abba (1352–1361)
Petrocino Casalesco (1362–1369)
Pietro Pileo di Prata (1370–1387)
Cosimo de' Migliorati (1387–1400)

15th century
Giovanni Nicolai de' Migliorati (1400–1405)
Tommaso Perendoli (1411–1445)
Bartolomeo Roverella (1445–1475)
Filiasio Roverella (1475–1516)

16th century
Niccolò Fieschi (1516–1517)
Urbano Fieschi (1517–1521)
Pietro de Accolti de Aretio (25 June 1524 Appointed – December 1524 Resigned)
Benedetto de Accolti (17 August 1524 Appointed – died 21 September 1549)
Ranuccio Farnese (11 October 1549 – 28 April 1564)
Giulio della Rovere (1566 Appointed – died 3 September 1578)
Cristoforo Boncampagni (1578–1603)

17th century
Pietro Aldobrandini (1604 Appointed – died 10 February 1621)
Luigi Capponi (3 March 1621 Appointed – 18 September 1645 Resigned)
Luca Torreggiani (1645–1669)
Paluzzo Paluzzi Altieri degli Albertoni died (19 May 1670 Appointed – 19 February 1674 Resigned)
Fabio Guinigi (1674–1691)
Raimondo Ferretti (1692–1719)

18th century
Girolamo Crispi (1720–1727)
Maffeo Nicola Farsetti (1727–1741)
vacant
Ferdinando Romualdo Guiccioli (1745–1763)
Nicola Oddi (1764–1767)
Antonio Cantoni (1767–1781)
vacant
Antonio Codronchi (1785–1826)

19th century
Clarissimo Falconieri Mellini (3 July 1826 Appointed – died 2 April 1859)
Enrico Orfei (23 March 1860 Appointed – died 22 December 1870)
Vincenzo Moretti (27 October 1871 Appointed – 22 September 1879 Resigned)
Giacomo Cattani (22 September 1879 Appointed – died 14 February 1887)
Sebastiano Galeati (23 May 1887 Appointed – died 25 January 1901)

20th century
Agostino Gaetano Riboldi (15 April 1901 Appointed – died 25 April 1902)
St. Guido Maria Conforti (9 June 1902 Appointed – 12 October 1904 Resigned); canonized in 2011
Pasquale Morganti (14 November 1904 Appointed – died 18 December 1921)
Antonio Lega (18 December 1921 Succeeded – died 16 November 1946)

Archdiocese of Ravenna and Cervia (1947–1986)
Giacomo Lercaro (31 January 1947 Appointed – 19 April 1952), appointed Archbishop of Bologna
Egidio Negrin (24 May 1952 Appointed – 4 April 1956), appointed Archbishop (Personal Title) of Treviso)
Salvatore Baldassarri (3 May 1956 Appointed – 29 November 1975 Resigned)

Archdiocese of Ravenna-Cervia (1986–present)

Ersilio Tonini (22 November 1975 Appointed – 27 October 1990 Retired) (see name changed in 1986; became Cardinal after retirement)
Luigi Amaducci (27 October 1990 Appointed – 9 March 2000 Retired)
Giuseppe Verucchi (9 March 2000 Appointed – )

See also
 Timeline of Ravenna

Notes

Sources

External links
Catholic Encyclopaedia

 
Ravenna

ca:Arquebisbat de Ravenna
de:Liste der Erzbischöfe von Ravenna
it:Arcidiocesi di Ravenna-Cervia
hu:Ravenna püspökeinek listája